Mikel Orbegozo Orbegozo (born 15 April 1989) is a Spanish footballer who plays for SD Beasain as a striker.

Club career
Born in San Sebastián, Gipuzkoa, Orbegozo began his career with hometown club Real Sociedad, playing four seasons with the reserves. In 2009–10, he scored a career-best 26 goals as the Basques returned to the Segunda División B after one year out.

On 2 July 2011, free agent Orbegozo signed a contract with neighbouring Athletic Bilbao running until 2014. He was immediately assigned to the B side, also in the third tier.

Orbegozo was loaned to Gimnàstic de Tarragona of Segunda División in early January 2012, on a six-month deal. He made his league debut on the 13th, in a 1–0 away loss against Celta de Vigo.

After subsequently serving loan stints at Sestao River Club and SD Amorebieta (both in his native Basque Country), Orbegozo was released by the Lions on 26 May 2014. On 15 June he joined another reserve team, Getafe CF B.

Personal life
Orbegozo's older brother, Jon, was also a footballer and a forward. He played and scored regularly (over 200 games, over 50 goals) in the third division with SD Lemona, Barakaldo CF and Amorebieta, but never featured in the professional divisions. Although they were opponents on several occasions, the siblings did not play together as seniors; Jon replaced Mikel in Amorebieta's squad in the summer of 2014.

References

External links

1989 births
Living people
Spanish footballers
Footballers from San Sebastián
Association football forwards
Segunda División players
Segunda División B players
Tercera División players
Real Sociedad B footballers
Bilbao Athletic footballers
Gimnàstic de Tarragona footballers
Sestao River footballers
SD Amorebieta footballers
Getafe CF B players
SD Compostela footballers
Marbella FC players
Real Jaén footballers
CD Ebro players
Real Unión footballers
CD Tudelano footballers
SD Beasain footballers